The Global Village Foundation (GVF) is a non-profit charitable organization which provides education and health care for children and rural villagers in Vietnam and some other countries of Asia. Established in 1999 by author and humanitarian Le Ly Hayslip, it is based in the United States.

In 1986, coming back to Vietnam after a 16-year absence, Hayslip was deeply affected by the poor living conditions and devastation there. Deciding to make a difference, she initially set up the East Meets West Foundation and later, Global Village Foundation for helping to rebuild and reconstruct her motherland and contributing to the peaceful dialogue between the United States and Vietnam.

The main fields of the foundation operations include:
 Education
 Portable Libraries Project (since 2006), setting up libraries in rural areas;
 Building new five schools (since 2000) and supplying them with equipment.
 Emergency relief
 Annual delivery of rice and aid to poor areas affected by drought, flood and other natural disasters;
 Helping victims of the 2004 tsunami in Thailand and Sri Lanka.
 Health and well-being
 Launching (from 2006) new Dental Health Education Project (DHEP) including dental hygiene education, preventive dental care, and dental health to the children in rural villages of Vietnam;
 Helping and founding massage centers for the blind (in 2005–6) in cooperation with Singapore students;
 Construction of two new houses for the Agent Orange victims in Quảng Nam Province, and giving support in emergency cases for poverty-stricken families (since 2005).

The 1993 film Heaven & Earth, directed by Oliver Stone, was based on the memoir When Heaven and Earth Changed Places by Global Village Foundation initiator Le Ly Hayslip, who had a cameo appearance in the film.

The story of Le Ly Hayslip's humanitarian journey and the activities of GVF in Vietnam were also portrayed in the award-winning DVD documentary, From War to Peace and Beyond.

In 1995, Le Ly Hayslip was honored by the California State Assembly award in Sacramento for her humanitarian and reconciliation activities.

See also
Le Ly Hayslip
East Meets West Foundation
List of non-governmental organizations in Vietnam

References

External links
GVF Home Page

Organizations established in 1999
Charities based in California
Foreign charities operating in Vietnam
Children's charities based in the United States
1999 establishments in the United States